Can Artam (born 30 June 1981, in Istanbul) is a Turkish race car driver born into a car racing family. He raced in the 2005 GP2 Series for the iSport team and was the 2001 US Barber Formula Dodge champion.

Career
Artam's career begun in karting in 1999, and he moved up to the Turkish Touring Car Championship in 2001. Later in the year he also raced in US Barber Formula Dodge, winning the title.

He remained in the TTCC in 2002, also racing in North American Fran Am 2000 Pro Championship and some races of Turkish Formula Three Championship, whilst returning to karting for some events. The Formula Renault would be the only series he would compete in during 2003, though with the new year seeing part seasons in both British Formula 3's National-Class and Formula Renault V6 Eurocup.

On 29 May 2004 Can Artam got his shot in Formula 3000 in Imola as the first Turkish driver racing in this category, driving part of the season for the Coloni team, and later driving some races for Super Nova. In 2005, he drove in GP2, the replacement series for F3000, for the iSport International team alongside Scott Speed, although without much success, scoring just two points with seventh place at the Monaco round of the inaugural GP2 championship. Until 2013 he has not raced in any major championships.

In 2013 he started racing again in the Turkish Touring Car Championship with Borusan Otomotiv Motorsport. He finished the first race of the season 3rd despite a flat tire.

Racing record

Career summary

International Formula 3000
(key) (Races in bold indicate pole position; races in italics indicate fastest lap.)

GP2 Series
(key) (Races in bold indicate pole position) (Races in italics indicate fastest lap)

References

External links
Career statistics at driverdb.com

1981 births
Living people
Turkish racing drivers
Formula Renault V6 Eurocup drivers
GP2 Series drivers
North American Formula Renault drivers
Sportspeople from Istanbul
International Formula 3000 drivers
Turkish Formula Three Championship drivers

EuroInternational drivers
Scuderia Coloni drivers
ISport International drivers
Super Nova Racing drivers
OAK Racing drivers
British Formula Three Championship drivers